Anarnatula sylea is a species of snout moth in the genus Anarnatula. It was described by Herbert Druce in 1899 and is known from Mexico.

References

Moths described in 1899
Epipaschiinae
Moths of Central America